Bloodlines is a two-episode British detective fiction thriller and a leading dramatic vehicle for Emma Pierson, who stars as rookie police officer Justine Hopkin. The series, produced by Granada Television and directed by Philip Martin, premiered on ITV on 31 January 2005, at 9PM, with episode two airing on 1 February 2005, again at 9PM. Episodes one and two are each 90 minutes in length. Initially envisioned as returning series, ITV chose not to recommission Bloodlines after viewing figures fell well below the expected target.

Plot
After Elaine Hopkin (Jan Francis) is found dead, the victim of an apparent an OD suicide, her firstborn Mark (Kieran O'Brien) refuses to even inform his dad James (Kevin McNally), who is locked up for murder. Kid sister Justine (Emma Pierson), a cocky uniformed cop, goes to visit him, only to learn that he has just been released. After the autopsy concludes asphyxiation, she compromises friendly DC Jake Bannerman (Max Beesley)'s official investigation by taking rash actions against procedure.

Cast
 Emma Pierson as P.C. Justine Hopkin
 Kevin McNally as James Hopkin
 Robert Pugh as D.C.I. Paul Jordan
 Max Beesley as D.C. Jake Bannerman
 Kieran O'Brien as Mark Hopkin
 Andy Rashleigh as D.I. Derek Thompson
 Jan Francis as Elaine Hopkin

Episodes

References

External links

2005 British television series debuts
2005 British television series endings
ITV television dramas
Television shows set in London
Television shows produced by Granada Television
Television series by ITV Studios
2000s British television miniseries
2000s British drama television series
2000s British crime television series
Detective television series
English-language television shows